In December 2011, Ethiopian forces recaptured the central Somali town of Beledweyne from Al-Shabaab fighters.

The Fighting 
al-Shabbab claimed to have repelled three Ethiopian attacks and then made a "tactical withdrawal". Ethiopian-TFG forces easily captured the town; however, residents still feared that the al-Shabbab would return and fight for the town. Eyewitnesses claimed both sides used heavy artillery and weapons.

References

Beledweyne 2011
War in Somalia (2009-)
December 2011 events in Africa
History of Beledweyne
Ethiopia–Somalia military relations
Beledweyne 2011
Battles in 2011